Loewia is the scientific name of two genera of organisms and may refer to:

Loewia (fly), a genus of insects in the family Tachinidae
Loewia (plant), a genus of plants in the family Passifloraceae